Sagarmatha Choudhary Eye Hospital at Lahan, Nepal is a non-profit eye hospital for residents of Eastern Nepal and neighboring districts of India.

Since its establishment, the hospital has treated more than five million outpatients and prescribed more than one million eye surgeries.

Services

Eye 
General OPD, Paying OPD, Fast Track OPD, Community Outreach, Pediatric Ophthalmology, Cataract, Retina, Glaucoma, Cornea, Low Vision services.

See also
Biratnagar Eye Hospital

External links

 
 
 
 
 
 

Hospitals in Nepal
Siraha District
Eye hospitals